

EB – Belgium 

All Belgian airports from Aeronautical Information Publication at Belgocontrol except where noted.

EB – Public airports

EB – Military airports

EB – Private airfields

EB – ULM fields

EB – Hospital heliports

EB – Private heliports

ED/ET – Germany

ED – Civilian airports

ET – Military airports

EE – Estonia

EF – Finland

EG – United Kingdom (and British Crown dependencies) 

Other categories: Airports in England, Airports in Northern Ireland, Airports in Scotland, Airports in Wales

EH – Netherlands

EI – Ireland

EK – Denmark and the Faroe Islands

Denmark

EK – Denmark hospital heliports

Faroe Islands

EL – Luxembourg 

All airports in Luxembourg from Aeronautical Information Publication at Belgocontrol.

EN – Norway 

Note: majority of the entries show "airport name, village or town or city" – "municipality", "county"

EP – Poland

ES – Sweden

EV – Latvia

EY – Lithuania

References

 
  – includes IATA codes
 Aviation Safety Network – IATA and ICAO airport codes

E
Airports by ICAO code
Airports by ICAO code
Airports by ICAO code
Airports by ICAO code
Airports by ICAO code
Airports by ICAO code
Airports by ICAO code
Airports by ICAO code
Airports by ICAO code
Airports by ICAO code
Airports by ICAO code
Airports by ICAO code
Airports by ICAO code
Airports by ICAO code
E